Vallja e çobanit is a folk dance in Albania. The name translates as the 'shepherd's dance' in English.

See also 
 Albanian dances

External links

Albanian folk dances